John Lade (c. 1731 – 1759), of Warbleton, Sussex, was a Member of Parliament for Camelford in 1754 – 21 April 1759.

References

Members of the Parliament of Great Britain for Camelford
British MPs 1754–1761
1730s births
1759 deaths
Year of birth uncertain
People from Warbleton
Baronets in the Baronetage of Great Britain